Brenda Starr is a comic strip (1940-2011) about a female reporter.

Brenda Starr may also refer to:

 Brenda Starr (1976 film), an American made-for-television adventure film based on the comic strip
 Brenda Starr (1989 film), a film based on the comic strip
 Brenda Starr, Reporter (film), a 1945 film serial based on the comic strip
 Brenda K. Starr (born 1966), American musician
 Brenda K. Starr (album)